Birendra Nath Datta (born 1 March 1935) is an Indian academician, a linguist, a researcher of folklore, a singer and lyricists of Assam. In his career, he mainly worked as a professor in different colleges of Assam. He also wrote scholarly books. In 2009, he was awarded the Padma Shri, the fourth highest civilian award, in the "Literature and Education" field and in 2010 he received the Jagaddhatri-Harmohan Das Literary award. Datta was elected as the president of Asom Sahitya Sabha for North Lakhimpur Session, 2003 and Hojai Session, 2004

Early life
He was born on 1 March 1935 at Nagaon, Assam to Kalpanath Datta, a school teacher and Mandakini Datta. Their original home is in Panera village, near Baihata Chariali.

He started his education at Chenikuthi L.P. School at Guwahati and then studied at Goalpara. In 1933 Datta secured ranks among the top 10 in both Matriculation and I.Sc examinations under Gauhati University. Then he came to Visva Bharati, Santiniketan to study Bachelor of Arts and later studied Master of Arts from Gauhati University in Economics.

Career 
In 1957, He started his career as a lecturer at B. Borooah College. In 1964, he joined Pramathesh Barua College at Gauripur in lower Assam as the founder principal. He worked as the principal in two other colleges as well, which were named Goalpara College and Pandu College.

In 1974, he obtained his Ph.D degree in folklore under the supervision of Prafulla Dutta Goswami.

In 1979 he joined Gauhati University as a reader and there he also became the Head of the Department of Folklore Research. He retired from Gauhati University in 1995. But, upon request, he again joined Tezpur University as a professor in the department of Traditional Culture and Art Forms.

Literary career
Datta also wrote a number of scholarly books. One of his books, Cultural Contours of Northeast India, was published by Oxford University Press. For his book Sankar Madhavar Manisha Aru Asomar Sanaskritic Uttaradhikar, he won the 12th Jagaddhatri-Harmohan Das Literary award.

Music career
Datta was also a singer and lyricist. Songs written by him include: "Monor Khobar", "Bahudin Bokulor Gondh Poa Naai", "Meli Dilo Man", "Rohimalaa Uronir Maajere", "Sou Sirish Daalat", "Tomaar Kaarane Jaau", "Aahinak Kone Anane", "Mou Daaponar", "Sita Banabaash", "Bogoli Bogaa Phot Di Ja", "Jilir Maate", "O Ghan Chirikaa", "Barashaa Tomaar", "Aakaashe Botaahe", "Aakaash Aamaak Akani Aakaash Diya " etc. He also sang song for an Assamese language film, Smrtir Parash, which was directed by Brojen Barua.

Awards
 Padma Shri (2009)
 Jagaddhatri-Harmohan Das Literary award (2010)

External links
 Few Songs of Birendra Nath Datta on YouTube.

1935 births
20th-century Indian educational theorists
Living people
People from Nagaon district
Recipients of the Padma Shri in literature & education
Indian folklorists
Gauhati University alumni
Visva-Bharati University alumni
Academic staff of Gauhati University
Asom Sahitya Sabha Presidents
Poets from Assam
Musicians from Assam
Assamese-language poets
20th-century Indian poets